Triplophysa rosa is a species of ray-finned fish in the genus Triplophysa.

Footnotes 
 

R
Fish described in 2005